Kryvbas may refer to:
Kryvbas mining region
FC Kryvbas Kryvyi Rih
FC Kryvbas-2 Kryvyi Rih
HK Kryvbas
Kryvbas, village in Kryvyi Rih Raion
40th Motorized Infantry Battalion (Ukraine)